Federico Mancarella (born 4 September 1992) is an Italian paracanoeist. He represents Italy in elite international competitions.

Career
Mancarella represented Italy at the 2016 Summer Paralympics in the men's KL2 event and finished in fifth place with a time of 45.596.

Mancarella again represented Italy at the 2020 Summer Paralympics in the men's KL2 event and won a bronze.

References

External links
 Federico Mancarella  at Olympics.com  

1992 births
Living people
Sportspeople from Bologna
Italian male canoeists
Paracanoeists at the 2016 Summer Paralympics
Paracanoeists at the 2020 Summer Paralympics
Medalists at the 2020 Summer Paralympics
Paralympic medalists in paracanoe
Paralympic bronze medalists for Italy
ICF Canoe Sprint World Championships medalists in paracanoe
21st-century Italian people